The Canadian province of New Brunswick was a British crown colony before it joined Canada in 1867. It had a system of responsible government beginning in 1854, and has kept its own legislature to deal with provincial matters. New Brunswick has a unicameral Westminster-style parliamentary government, in which the premier is the leader of the party that has the confidence of the Legislative Assembly to form a government. The premier is New Brunswick's head of government, and the king of Canada is its head of state and is represented by the lieutenant governor of New Brunswick. The premier picks a cabinet from the elected members to form the Executive Council of New Brunswick, and presides over that body.

Members are first elected to the legislature during general elections. General elections must be conducted every five years from the date of the last election, but the premier may ask for early dissolution of the Legislative Assembly. An election may also take place if the governing party loses the confidence of the legislature by the defeat of a supply bill or tabling of a confidence motion.

New Brunswick has had 36 individuals serve as first minister. The province had five individuals as leaders while a colony, and 31 individuals after Canadian Confederation, of which two were from the Confederation Party, 11 from the Progressive Conservative Party of New Brunswick, 15 from the New Brunswick Liberal Association, one from the Anti-Confederation Party, and seven with unofficial party affiliations.

Premiers of New Brunswick

|-
|colspan=10|Leader of the Government of the Colony of New Brunswick (1854–1867)

|-
|colspan=10|Premiers of the province of New Brunswick since Confederation (1867–present)

See also
 Leader of the Opposition (New Brunswick)

References 
General

 
 
 

Specific

External links
 New Brunswick Office of the Premier

New Brunswick

Premiers